The 2019 Swedish Athletics Championships was the 124th national outdoor track and field championships for Sweden. It was held from 30 August–1 September at Tingvalla IP in Karlstad. It was organised by IF Göta Karlstad.

Championships
Swedish outdoor championships took place at several venues beyond the main track and field championships.

Results

Men

Women

References

 Swedish Championships 2019. smfriidrott. Retrieved 2020-02-02.
 Swedish Championships Results. Friidrott.se. Retrieved 2020-02-02.

External links
 Swedish Athletics Federation website

Swedish Athletics Championships
Swedish Athletics Championships
Swedish Athletics Championships
Swedish Athletics Championships
Sports competitions in Karlstad